Michael Bach may refer to:

 Michael Bach (entomologist) (1808–1878), German entomologist
 Michael Bach (musician) (born 1958), German cellist, composer, and visual artist
 Michael Bach (rower) (born 1960), former American rower
 Michael Bach (vision scientist) (born 1950), German vision scientist